Diospyros vaccinioides, the small persimmon, is a herbaceous plant, a member of the Ebenaceae family. This plant is mainly found in China and it is known to thrive in subtropical biomes.

Description 
It is a shrub with small, glossy, round leaves; it has small, white, bell-shaped flowers, and purple fruit. It has veins that are arranged in a pinnate pattern. The plant has a slow growth rate and ranges in size from a shrub to a small tree, It is mainly used for ornamental value which has classified it as endangered. It is an evergreen which indicates that the leaves are thick and leathery. The leaves can stay on the tree for around 2 or more years and fall at any season. The foliage remains green and is functional for more than one growing season. This plant flowers in the spring and produces fruit, a small persimmon, in the fall and winter seasons. The fruit produced by this plant, small persimmons, are classified as berries.

Distribution 

It is an endemic species to Taiwan. It is also native to China, specifically the Guangdong province, Hongkong, and Hainan. This plant is found in a subtropical biome which consists of high temperatures, low precipitation, and warm soil. Due to its affinity for these conditions, the plant has full sun exposure from a young age and a small amount of shade in all climates which means it requires a high amount of water. It has no frost tolerance and high tolerance to wind.

Taxonomy 
It was named by John Lindley, in Exot. Fl. 2: t. 139. in 1825.

References

External links 
 Hong Kong Herbarium-HK Plant Database-Diospyros vaccinioides Lindl.

vaccinioides